Phil Ford (born 16 March 1961), also known by the nickname of "The Rubber Man", is a Welsh former rugby union and professional rugby league footballer who played in the 1980s and 1990s.

His brother Steve Ford was a Wales national rugby union team footballer, who was suspended for a period for having played a rugby league trial with Leeds. His nephew is Wales rugby league international Lloyd White.

Ford initially played rugby union in Wales at club level for Cardiff RFC and Rumney RFC. He changed rugby football codes from rugby union to rugby league when he transferred to Warrington during 1981. Ford was selected to go on the 1988 Great Britain Lions tour. He was a member of the Great Britain team that won the third Ashes Test in Australia. It was their first victory over Australia since the second Test at Odsal Stadium, Bradford during 1978. He was selected for Wales (RL) to compete in the 1995 Rugby League World Cup. Ford was nicknamed The Rubber Man due to his elusive running style. Following his rugby league career, he returned to live in Cardiff, and he changed codes from rugby league to rugby union when he transferred to Rumney RFC.

County Cup Final appearances

Phil Ford played , i.e. number 2, in Bradford Northern's 12–12 draw with Castleford in the 1987 Yorkshire County Cup Final during the 1987–88 season at Headingley, Leeds on Saturday 17 October 1987, and played  in the 11–2 victory over Castleford in the 1987 Yorkshire County Cup Final replay during the 1987–88 season at Elland Road, Leeds on Saturday 31 October 1987.

References

External links
!Great Britain Statistics at englandrl.co.uk (statistics currently missing due to not having appeared for both Great Britain, and England)
(archived by web.archive.org) Crooks in trouble

1961 births
Living people
Bradford Bulls players
Cardiff RFC players
Footballers who switched code
Great Britain national rugby league team players
Leeds Rhinos players
Pontypool RFC players
Rugby league centres
Rugby league fullbacks
Rugby league players from Cardiff
Rugby league wingers
Rugby League XIII players
Rugby union players from Cardiff
Rumney RFC players
Salford Red Devils players
Wales national rugby league team players
Warrington Wolves players
Welsh rugby league players
Welsh rugby union players
Wigan Warriors players